Robbie Miller (born 30 December 1979) is a New Zealand cricketer. He played in one first-class match for Canterbury in 2002/03.

See also
 List of Canterbury representative cricketers

References

External links
 

1979 births
Living people
New Zealand cricketers
Canterbury cricketers
Cricketers from Christchurch